Jackson Township is one of nine townships in Hamilton County, Indiana, United States. As of the 2010 census, its population was 10,368 and it contained 4,367 housing units.

History
Jackson Township was organized in 1833.

Roberts Chapel was listed on the National Register of Historic Places in 1996.

Geography
The streams of Bear Slide Creek, Bennett Ditch, Cicero Creek, Hinkle Creek, Little Cicero Creek, Possum Run, Sugar Run, Taylor Creek, and Weasel Creek run through this township.

Cities and towns
 Atlanta
 Arcadia
 Cicero

Unincorporated communities
 Deming
 Millersburg
(This list is based on USGS data and may include former settlements.)

Adjacent townships
 Cicero Township, Tipton County (north)
 White River Township (east)
 Noblesville Township (south)
 Washington Township (southwest)
 Adams Township (west)
 Jefferson Township, Tipton County (northwest)

Cemeteries
The township contains thirteen cemeteries: Brethren, Cicero, Dunn, Emmanuel Lutheran, Hinkle, Hurley, Morley, Mount Pleasant, Robert's Chapel, Scherer, Taylor and West Grove.

Major highways
 U.S. Route 31
 State Road 19

Airports and landing strips
 Heinzman Airport

Education
Jackson Township residents may request a free library card from the Hamilton North Public Library in Cicero.

The township is served by Hamilton Heights School Corporation, which is located in Arcadia.

References
 
 United States Census Bureau cartographic boundary files

External links
 Indiana Township Association
 United Township Association of Indiana

Townships in Hamilton County, Indiana
Townships in Indiana